Lalić (Serbian Cyrillic: Лалић) is a village in Serbia. It is situated in the Odžaci municipality in the West Bačka District, Vojvodina province. The village is ethnically mixed and has population of 1,646 people (2002 census), including several ethnic groups, among them 796 Slovaks, 702 Serbs, and others. Its twin town is Mošovce (Slovakia).

Historical population

1961: 2,352
1971: 2,125
1981: 1,859
1991: 1,699
2014: 1.423

See also
List of places in Serbia
List of cities, towns and villages in Vojvodina

References
Slobodan Ćurčić, Broj stanovnika Vojvodine, Novi Sad, 1996.

External links 

Lalić

Places in Bačka
West Bačka District
Odžaci